The Murraylands is a geographical region of the Australian state of South Australia (SA); its name reflects that of the river running through it. The region's economy is centred on agriculture (especially vegetables, grains  and livestock), and tourism, especially along its  frontage of the River Murray. 

The main towns in the region, in order of population at the 2016 census, are:
 Murray Bridge (16,560)
 Tailem Bend (1660)
 Mannum (2640)
 Milang (880)
 Lameroo (850)
 Pinnaroo (710)
 Callington (610)
 Truro (550)
 Karoonda (510)
 Blanchetown (310)
 Swan Reach (280).

These towns' populations totalled 24,600. People living outside the towns approximated 8,000.

The region has a Mediterranean climate, with warm to hot, dry summers and mild winters.

Regional context
The Murraylands region is long established in South Australia and the name is widely used by residents of the region and elsewhere in the state, but there is a multiplicity of names that refer to the geography in that part of the state. Local Government Areas and South Australian Government Regions continually change, and in the case of the Murraylands, its boundaries no longer correspond exactly with other types of divisions. , the 2018 state electorate of Hammond had the nearest-equivalent borders. Of similar size to the Murray and Mallee region is Regional Development Australia's Murraylands and Riverland Region. A generic term, applied to a larger area than the Murraylands, is Murray Mallee. Tourism regions are different again: the South Australian Tourism Commission includes the Murraylands with the lakes at the mouth of the Murray, and The Coorong, in an area that earned $148  million in 2018. The area extends well into the state of Victoria, where it is known simply as The Mallee.

Economy 

The Murraylands economy is strongly reliant on primary industry. In 2014–15, primary production accounted for 41.6 per cent of the gross regional product in the SA Government's Murray and Mallee region. Within the Murraylands, the top three commodities were vegetables, grains  and livestock. From 2001 to 2009 and 2017 to 2019, the Murraylands region was one of many regions in south-east Australia afflicted by severe drought, which significantly degraded the economy.

Governance 
, local government councils within the Murraylands were: 
 Mid Murray Council 
 District Council of Loxton Waikerie
 District Council of Karoonda East Murray
 Rural City of Murray Bridge
 Southern Mallee District Council
 District Council of The Coorong

Recreation and tourism 
Recreational opportunities are abundant in the region. There are many sport facilities, reserves, parks, and trails for walking, cycling and horse riding. Many are connected to the River Murray.

Recreational fishing and watersports are especially popular. The Murray Bridge Rowing Club, founded in 1909, is one of South Australia's oldest rowing clubs  and has fostered many champions, including recent world champion and Olympic medal winner, James McRae; and Walter Pfeiffer, Walter Jarvis, Frank Cummings, Ted Thomas (rower), Herbert Graetz, William Sladden, Robert Cummings, Arthur Scott, and Alf Taeuber.

Festivals and events 
:

River Murray International Dark Sky Reserve 
At the north-west corner of the Murraylands is the River Murray International Dark Sky Reserve, an area of  centred on the Swan Reach Conservation Park – one of the darkest locations in the world. The darkness is enhanced by the dry climate and low humidity with long periods of clear skies all year round. Low population, freedom from major development, and supportive policies of the Mid Murray Council regarding artificial light and future development were also crucial in the reserve being established.

Conservation 
Respect for the natural environment on which they depend is a strong characteristic of people in the area. The region has a number of national parks and conservation areas where bush walking, sightseeing, bird watching, camping, caravanning, 4-wheel driving and orienteering activities are welcome. They include:
 Ngarkat Conservation Park: a very large area at the south-east corner of the Murraylands. Bush tracks are available to 4-wheel vehicles.
 Ngaut Ngaut Conservation Park: near the town of Nildottie. Culturally significant traditional lands of the Nganguraku people; only accessible with a guided tour.
 Coorong National Park:   of coastal saltwater lagoons and wetlands scenery, home to many species of birds including native ducks and swans, pelicans, and migratory birds.

Education 
, the Murraylands region had 47 educational establishments within and immediately outside its boundaries, as shown in the table.

Media 
 WIN TV
 Power FM – 98.7 FM
 5MU Radio Murray Bridge – 96.3 FM
 Flow FM – 97.7FM
 ABC Classic - 103.9 FM
 ABC Local Radio - 891 AM
 ABC News Radio - 972 AM
 ABC Radio National – 729 AM
 ABC Triple J - 105.5 FM

Notes

References

External links
 Murray River, Lakes and Coorong Tourism
 Regional development Australia Murraylands and Riverland 
 River Murray International Dark Sky Reserve
 Murraylands Food Alliance

Regions of South Australia